Egnatia Mariniana was probably the wife of Roman Emperor Valerian and mother of Emperor Gallienus.

Life
Several coins bearing the legend DIVAE MARINIANAE date back to the beginning of the reign of Valerian and Gallienus. She died before Valerian's ascension to the throne in 253.

Previously it had been assumed that Egnatius Victor Marinianus, legatus of Arabia Petraea and Moesia Superior, was the father of Mariniana. More recently however, it has been postulated that she was the daughter of Lucius Egnatius Victor, suffect consul before 207, and therefore Egnatius Victor Marinianus' sister.

References

Sources
 Mennen, Inge, Power and Status in the Roman Empire, AD 193-284 (2011)

3rd-century Roman women
Deified Roman women
Augustae
Wives of Roman emperors
Mariniana
Valerian dynasty